The 1985 VFL season was the 89th season of the Victorian Football League (VFL), the highest level senior Australian rules football competition in Victoria.

The season featured twelve clubs, ran from 23 March until 28 September, and comprised a 22-game home-and-away season followed by a finals series featuring the top five clubs. The season was the first to feature premiership matches on Friday nights.

The premiership was won by the Essendon Football Club for the 14th time and second time consecutively, after it defeated  by 78 points in the 1985 VFL Grand Final.

Night series
 defeated  11.11 (77) to 10.8 (68) in the final.

Premiership season

Round 1

|- bgcolor="#CCCCFF"
| Home team
| Home team score
| Away team
| Away team score
| Venue
| Crowd
| Date
|- bgcolor="#FFFFFF"
| 
| 15.13 (103)
| 
| 21.15 (141)
| MCG
| 65,628
| 29 March 1985
|- bgcolor="#FFFFFF"
| 
| 8.18 (66)
| 
| 26.20 (176)
| Moorabbin Oval
| 20,910
| 30 March 1985
|- bgcolor="#FFFFFF"
| 
| 21.11 (137)
| 
| 18.12 (120)
| Windy Hill
| 22,802
| 30 March 1985
|- bgcolor="#FFFFFF"
| 
| 17.10 (112)
| 
| 22.10 (142)
| Princes Park
| 26,873
| 30 March 1985
|- bgcolor="#FFFFFF"
| 
| 20.8 (128)
| 
| 14.18 (102)
| MCG
| 20,910
| 30 March 1985
|- bgcolor="#FFFFFF"
| 
| 20.8 (128)
| 
| 14.16 (100)
| VFL Park
| 20,776
| 30 March 1985

Round 2

|- bgcolor="#CCCCFF"
| Home team
| Home team score
| Away team
| Away team score
| Venue
| Crowd
| Date
|- bgcolor="#FFFFFF"
| 
| 12.16 (88)
| 
| 13.14 (92)
| MCG
| 24,113
| 6 April 1985
|- bgcolor="#FFFFFF"
| 
| 14.12 (96)
| 
| 18.11 (119)
| Kardinia Park
| 32,966
| 6 April 1985
|- bgcolor="#FFFFFF"
| 
| 2.17 (29)
| 
| 25.19 (169)
| Moorabbin Oval
| 18,655
| 6 April 1985
|- bgcolor="#FFFFFF"
| 
| 25.20 (170)
| 
| 14.18 (102)
| Princes Park
| 17,278
| 8 April 1985
|- bgcolor="#FFFFFF"
| 
| 8.15 (63)
| 
| 24.22 (166)
| Victoria Park
| 17,093
| 8 April 1985
|- bgcolor="#FFFFFF"
| 
| 20.14 (134)
| 
| 16.12 (108)
| VFL Park
| 24,056
| 8 April 1985

Round 3

|- bgcolor="#CCCCFF"
| Home team
| Home team score
| Away team
| Away team score
| Venue
| Crowd
| Date
|- bgcolor="#FFFFFF"
| 
| 17.12 (114)
| 
| 15.10 (100)
| VFL Park
| 41,694
| 23 March 1985
|- bgcolor="#FFFFFF"
| 
| 31.25 (211)
| 
| 14.14 (98)
| MCG
| 17,753
| 13 April 1985
|- bgcolor="#FFFFFF"
| 
| 26.14 (170)
| 
| 16.9 (105)
| Western Oval
| 23,259
| 13 April 1985
|- bgcolor="#FFFFFF"
| 
| 19.9 (123)
| 
| 16.17 (113)
| Victoria Park
| 22,896
| 13 April 1985
|- bgcolor="#FFFFFF"
| 
| 22.13 (145)
| 
| 22.15 (147)
| Princes Park
| 20,404
| 13 April 1985
|- bgcolor="#FFFFFF"
| 
| 18.12 (120)
| 
| 26.15 (171)
| SCG
| 10,204
| 14 April 1985

The average score by each team this round was 134.8, which stands as the VFL/AFL record.

Round 4

|- bgcolor="#CCCCFF"
| Home team
| Home team score
| Away team
| Away team score
| Venue
| Crowd
| Date
|- bgcolor="#FFFFFF"
| 
| 16.15 (111)
| 
| 11.6 (72)
| MCG
| 12,895
| 20 April 1985
|- bgcolor="#FFFFFF"
| 
| 12.14 (86)
| 
| 15.13 (103)
| Victoria Park
| 11,056
| 20 April 1985
|- bgcolor="#FFFFFF"
| 
| 24.17 (161)
| 
| 13.11 (89)
| Princes Park
| 19,894
| 20 April 1985
|- bgcolor="#FFFFFF"
| 
| 13.8 (86)
| 
| 12.10 (82)
| Windy Hill
| 26,550
| 20 April 1985
|- bgcolor="#FFFFFF"
| 
| 14.18 (102)
| 
| 12.11 (83)
| VFL Park
| 20,797
| 20 April 1985
|- bgcolor="#FFFFFF"
| 
| 5.14 (44)
| 
| 8.15 (63)
| SCG
| 7,860
| 21 April 1985

Round 5

|- bgcolor="#CCCCFF"
| Home team
| Home team score
| Away team
| Away team score
| Venue
| Crowd
| Date
|- bgcolor="#FFFFFF"
| 
| 18.13 (121)
| 
| 13.14 (92)
| MCG
| 53,067
| 25 April 1985
|- bgcolor="#FFFFFF"
| 
| 19.12 (126)
| 
| 18.14 (122)
| VFL Park
| 20,480
| 25 April 1985
|- bgcolor="#FFFFFF"
| 
| 21.23 (149)
| 
| 29.14 (188)
| Princes Park
| 17,268
| 27 April 1985
|- bgcolor="#FFFFFF"
| 
| 16.23 (119)
| 
| 14.9 (93)
| Kardinia Park
| 16,492
| 27 April 1985
|- bgcolor="#FFFFFF"
| 
| 15.15 (105)
| 
| 13.12 (90)
| Victoria Park
| 23,306
| 27 April 1985
|- bgcolor="#FFFFFF"
| 
| 18.17 (125)
| 
| 11.18 (84)
| Western Oval
| 33,677
| 27 April 1985

Round 6

|- bgcolor="#CCCCFF"
| Home team
| Home team score
| Away team
| Away team score
| Venue
| Crowd
| Date
|- bgcolor="#FFFFFF"
| 
| 20.11 (131)
| 
| 20.12 (132)
| MCG
| 23,815
| 4 May 1985
|- bgcolor="#FFFFFF"
| 
| 15.12 (102)
| 
| 19.16 (130)
| Victoria Park
| 9,231
| 4 May 1985
|- bgcolor="#FFFFFF"
| 
| 16.12 (108)
| 
| 15.21 (111)
| Moorabbin Oval
| 16,000
| 4 May 1985
|- bgcolor="#FFFFFF"
| 
| 27.14 (176)
| 
| 8.19 (67)
| Windy Hill
| 22,644
| 4 May 1985
|- bgcolor="#FFFFFF"
| 
| 16.10 (106)
| 
| 13.10 (88)
| VFL Park
| 58,733
| 4 May 1985
|- bgcolor="#FFFFFF"
| 
| 25.11 (161)
| 
| 11.17 (83)
| SCG
| 9,537
| 5 May 1985

Round 7

|- bgcolor="#CCCCFF"
| Home team
| Home team score
| Away team
| Away team score
| Venue
| Crowd
| Date
|- bgcolor="#FFFFFF"
| 
| 28.15 (183)
| 
| 8.9 (57)
| Princes Park
| 8,762
| 11 May 1985
|- bgcolor="#FFFFFF"
| 
| 12.13 (85)
| 
| 5.10 (40)
| Kardinia Park
| 15,000
| 11 May 1985
|- bgcolor="#FFFFFF"
| 
| 11.15 (81)
| 
| 25.10 (160)
| Victoria Park
| 22,964
| 11 May 1985
|- bgcolor="#FFFFFF"
| 
| 15.11 (101)
| 
| 23.13 (151)
| MCG
| 36,250
| 11 May 1985
|- bgcolor="#FFFFFF"
| 
| 22.20 (152)
| 
| 14.9 (93)
| VFL Park
| 37,125
| 11 May 1985
|- bgcolor="#FFFFFF"
| 
| 11.17 (83)
| 
| 12.16 (88)
| SCG
| 12,507
| 12 May 1985

Round 8

|- bgcolor="#CCCCFF"
| Home team
| Home team score
| Away team
| Away team score
| Venue
| Crowd
| Date
|- bgcolor="#FFFFFF"
| 
| 11.8 (74)
| 
| 6.10 (46)
| MCG
| 14,572
| 18 May 1985
|- bgcolor="#FFFFFF"
| 
| 8.9 (57)
| 
| 6.10 (46)
| Victoria Park
| 20,731
| 18 May 1985
|- bgcolor="#FFFFFF"
| 
| 11.18 (84)
| 
| 9.13 (67)
| Princes Park
| 21,777
| 18 May 1985
|- bgcolor="#FFFFFF"
| 
| 11.7 (73)
| 
| 12.15 (87)
| Western Oval
| 16,952
| 18 May 1985
|- bgcolor="#FFFFFF"
| 
| 8.11 (59)
| 
| 10.15 (75)
| Kardinia Park
| 23,102
| 18 May 1985
|- bgcolor="#FFFFFF"
| 
| 16.10 (106)
| 
| 7.12 (54)
| VFL Park
| 16,282
| 18 May 1985

Round 9

|- bgcolor="#CCCCFF"
| Home team
| Home team score
| Away team
| Away team score
| Venue
| Crowd
| Date
|- bgcolor="#FFFFFF"
| 
| 23.15 (153)
| 
| 9.17 (71)
| Windy Hill
| 19,985
| 25 May 1985
|- bgcolor="#FFFFFF"
| 
| 16.15 (111)
| 
| 18.19 (127)
| MCG
| 31,347
| 25 May 1985
|- bgcolor="#FFFFFF"
| 
| 17.24 (126)
| 
| 16.11 (107)
| Princes Park
| 16,686
| 25 May 1985
|- bgcolor="#FFFFFF"
| 
| 20.17 (137)
| 
| 24.18 (162)
| Moorabbin Oval
| 22,348
| 25 May 1985
|- bgcolor="#FFFFFF"
| 
| 19.9 (123)
| 
| 18.16 (124)
| VFL Park
| 29,455
| 25 May 1985
|- bgcolor="#FFFFFF"
| 
| 13.11 (89)
| 
| 16.21 (117)
| SCG
| 12,577
| 26 May 1985

Round 10

|- bgcolor="#CCCCFF"
| Home team
| Home team score
| Away team
| Away team score
| Venue
| Crowd
| Date
|- bgcolor="#FFFFFF"
| 
| 15.19 (109)
| 
| 14.8 (92)
| MCG
| 16,749
| 1 June 1985
|- bgcolor="#FFFFFF"
| 
| 17.15 (117)
| 
| 19.14 (128)
| Victoria Park
| 11,333
| 1 June 1985
|- bgcolor="#FFFFFF"
| 
| 9.14 (68)
| 
| 22.15 (147)
| Princes Park
| 25,424
| 1 June 1985
|- bgcolor="#FFFFFF"
| 
| 18.12 (120)
| 
| 21.20 (146)
| Moorabbin Oval
| 16,536
| 1 June 1985
|- bgcolor="#FFFFFF"
| 
| 10.10 (70)
| 
| 18.12 (120)
| VFL Park
| 24,849
| 1 June 1985
|- bgcolor="#FFFFFF"
| 
| 16.10 (106)
| 
| 12.8 (80)
| MCG
| 45,408
| 2 June 1985

Round 11

|- bgcolor="#CCCCFF"
| Home team
| Home team score
| Away team
| Away team score
| Venue
| Crowd
| Date
|- bgcolor="#FFFFFF"
| 
| 15.11 (101)
| 
| 17.19 (121)
| MCG
| 31,606
| 8 June 1985
|- bgcolor="#FFFFFF"
| 
| 15.21 (111)
| 
| 13.12 (90)
| Western Oval
| 17,538
| 8 June 1985
|- bgcolor="#FFFFFF"
| 
| 17.11 (113)
| 
| 11.5 (71)
| Windy Hill
| 17,652
| 8 June 1985
|- bgcolor="#FFFFFF"
| 
| 17.11 (113)
| 
| 17.11 (113)
| MCG
| 39,084
| 10 June 1985
|- bgcolor="#FFFFFF"
| 
| 17.8 (110)
| 
| 20.21 (141)
| Kardinia Park
| 20,000
| 10 June 1985
|- bgcolor="#FFFFFF"
| 
| 13.9 (87)
| 
| 16.14 (110)
| VFL Park
| 56,604
| 10 June 1985

Round 12

|- bgcolor="#CCCCFF"
| Home team
| Home team score
| Away team
| Away team score
| Venue
| Crowd
| Date
|- bgcolor="#FFFFFF"
| 
| 9.10 (64)
| 
| 14.17 (101)
| Victoria Park
| 19,573
| 15 June 1985
|- bgcolor="#FFFFFF"
| 
| 17.15 (117)
| 
| 13.10 (88)
| Princes Park
| 11,377
| 15 June 1985
|- bgcolor="#FFFFFF"
| 
| 10.9 (69)
| 
| 23.12 (150)
| MCG
| 36,851
| 15 June 1985
|- bgcolor="#FFFFFF"
| 
| 13.8 (86)
| 
| 5.9 (39)
| Western Oval
| 20,707
| 15 June 1985
|- bgcolor="#FFFFFF"
| 
| 11.15 (81)
| 
| 6.11 (47)
| VFL Park
| 14,668
| 15 June 1985
|- bgcolor="#FFFFFF"
| 
| 23.21 (159)
| 
| 13.14 (92)
| SCG
| 7,811
| 16 June 1985

Round 13

|- bgcolor="#CCCCFF"
| Home team
| Home team score
| Away team
| Away team score
| Venue
| Crowd
| Date
|- bgcolor="#FFFFFF"
| 
| 21.14 (140)
| 
| 16.17 (113)
| Windy Hill
| 18,398
| 22 June 1985
|- bgcolor="#FFFFFF"
| 
| 12.13 (85)
| 
| 13.13 (91)
| Victoria Park
| 16,852
| 22 June 1985
|- bgcolor="#FFFFFF"
| 
| 20.19 (139)
| 
| 16.11 (107)
| Princes Park
| 13,534
| 22 June 1985
|- bgcolor="#FFFFFF"
| 
| 12.9 (81)
| 
| 11.31 (97)
| MCG
| 16,406
| 22 June 1985
|- bgcolor="#FFFFFF"
| 
| 9.21 (75)
| 
| 11.11 (77)
| VFL Park
| 22,319
| 22 June 1985
|- bgcolor="#FFFFFF"
| 
| 19.23 (137)
| 
| 8.12 (60)
| SCG
| 9,504
| 23 June 1985

Round 14

|- bgcolor="#CCCCFF"
| Home team
| Home team score
| Away team
| Away team score
| Venue
| Crowd
| Date
|- bgcolor="#FFFFFF"
| 
| 10.15 (75)
| 
| 22.19 (151)
| MCG
| 32,861
| 28 June 1985
|- bgcolor="#FFFFFF"
| 
| 13.17 (95)
| 
| 11.14 (80)
| Victoria Park
| 9,953
| 29 June 1985
|- bgcolor="#FFFFFF"
| 
| 12.9 (81)
| 
| 17.15 (117)
| Moorabbin Oval
| 14,243
| 29 June 1985
|- bgcolor="#FFFFFF"
| 
| 17.22 (124)
| 
| 23.8 (146)
| Kardinia Park
| 17,000
| 29 June 1985
|- bgcolor="#FFFFFF"
| 
| 12.13 (85)
| 
| 23.19 (157)
| MCG
| 29,154
| 29 June 1985
|- bgcolor="#FFFFFF"
| 
| 15.11 (101)
| 
| 21.11 (137)
| VFL Park
| 48,880
| 29 June 1985

Round 15

Round 16

|- bgcolor="#CCCCFF"
| Home team
| Home team score
| Away team
| Away team score
| Venue
| Crowd
| Date
|- bgcolor="#FFFFFF"
| 
| 16.13 (109)
| 
| 18.10 (118)
| Victoria Park
| 8,735
| 13 July 1985
|- bgcolor="#FFFFFF"
| 
| 17.11 (113)
| 
| 27.18 (180)
| MCG
| 23,522
| 13 July 1985
|- bgcolor="#FFFFFF"
| 
| 17.10 (112)
| 
| 13.10 (88)
| Windy Hill
| 28,144
| 20 July 1985
|- bgcolor="#FFFFFF"
| 
| 12.19 (91)
| 
| 20.11 (131)
| MCG
| 17,686
| 20 July 1985
|- bgcolor="#FFFFFF"
| 
| 14.15 (99)
| 
| 5.9 (39)
| VFL Park
| 17,920
| 20 July 1985
|- bgcolor="#FFFFFF"
| 
| 17.21 (123)
| 
| 29.11 (185)
| SCG
| 12,172
| 21 July 1985

Round 17

|- bgcolor="#CCCCFF"
| Home team
| Home team score
| Away team
| Away team score
| Venue
| Crowd
| Date
|- bgcolor="#FFFFFF"
| 
| 14.18 (102)
| 
| 12.9 (81)
| Kardinia Park
| 11,989
| 27 July 1985
|- bgcolor="#FFFFFF"
| 
| 15.15 (105)
| 
| 11.13 (79)
| Western Oval
| 13,026
| 27 July 1985
|- bgcolor="#FFFFFF"
| 
| 13.8 (86)
| 
| 11.12 (78)
| Victoria Park
| 20,336
| 27 July 1985
|- bgcolor="#FFFFFF"
| 
| 18.12 (120)
| 
| 10.8 (68)
| Princes Park
| 28,786
| 27 July 1985
|- bgcolor="#FFFFFF"
| 
| 17.12 (114)
| 
| 16.14 (110)
| MCG
| 10,787
| 27 July 1985
|- bgcolor="#FFFFFF"
| 
| 19.20 (134)
| 
| 8.14 (62)
| VFL Park
| 13,197
| 27 July 1985

Round 18

|- bgcolor="#CCCCFF"
| Home team
| Home team score
| Away team
| Away team score
| Venue
| Crowd
| Date
|- bgcolor="#FFFFFF"
| 
| 25.16 (166)
| 
| 8.14 (62)
| Windy Hill
| 18,894
| 3 August 1985
|- bgcolor="#FFFFFF"
| 
| 19.13 (127)
| 
| 14.9 (93)
| Princes Park
| 15,717
| 3 August 1985
|- bgcolor="#FFFFFF"
| 
| 13.16 (94)
| 
| 20.15 (135)
| Moorabbin Oval
| 10,911
| 3 August 1985
|- bgcolor="#FFFFFF"
| 
| 12.14 (86)
| 
| 21.18 (144)
| MCG
| 16,421
| 3 August 1985
|- bgcolor="#FFFFFF"
| 
| 14.21 (105)
| 
| 14.10 (94)
| Victoria Park
| 15,958
| 3 August 1985
|- bgcolor="#FFFFFF"
| 
| 25.16 (166)
| 
| 17.6 (108)
| VFL Park
| 16,205
| 3 August 1985

Round 19

|- bgcolor="#CCCCFF"
| Home team
| Home team score
| Away team
| Away team score
| Venue
| Crowd
| Date
|- bgcolor="#FFFFFF"
| 
| 10.12 (72)
| 
| 12.5 (77)
| Victoria Park
| 11,022
| 10 August 1985
|- bgcolor="#FFFFFF"
| 
| 7.8 (50)
| 
| 8.11 (59)
| Moorabbin Oval
| 11,779
| 10 August 1985
|- bgcolor="#FFFFFF"
| 
| 15.6 (96)
| 
| 8.16 (64)
| Princes Park
| 15,799
| 10 August 1985
|- bgcolor="#FFFFFF"
| 
| 11.14 (80)
| 
| 23.15 (153)
| MCG
| 24,125
| 10 August 1985
|- bgcolor="#FFFFFF"
| 
| 13.11 (89)
| 
| 8.16 (64)
| VFL Park
| 34,614
| 10 August 1985
|- bgcolor="#FFFFFF"
| 
| 12.22 (94)
| 
| 14.15 (99)
| SCG
| 9,215
| 11 August 1985

Round 20

|- bgcolor="#CCCCFF"
| Home team
| Home team score
| Away team
| Away team score
| Venue
| Crowd
| Date
|- bgcolor="#FFFFFF"
| 
| 16.20 (116)
| 
| 9.12 (66)
| Arden St Oval
| 7,341
| 17 August 1985
|- bgcolor="#FFFFFF"
| 
| 13.13 (91)
| 
| 9.10 (64)
| Kardinia Park
| 12,422
| 17 August 1985
|- bgcolor="#FFFFFF"
| 
| 5.13 (43)
| 
| 5.8 (38)
| Western Oval
| 21,828
| 17 August 1985
|- bgcolor="#FFFFFF"
| 
| 12.15 (87)
| 
| 8.11 (59)
| Princes Park
| 16,902
| 17 August 1985
|- bgcolor="#FFFFFF"
| 
| 15.7 (97)
| 
| 17.10 (112)
| MCG
| 22,193
| 17 August 1985
|- bgcolor="#FFFFFF"
| 
| 17.18 (120)
| 
| 9.15 (69)
| VFL Park
| 15,709
| 17 August 1985

Round 21

|- bgcolor="#CCCCFF"
| Home team
| Home team score
| Away team
| Away team score
| Venue
| Crowd
| Date
|- bgcolor="#FFFFFF"
| 
| 27.22 (184)
| 
| 14.7 (91)
| Windy Hill
| 14,133
| 24 August 1985
|- bgcolor="#FFFFFF"
| 
| 9.10 (64)
| 
| 15.19 (109)
| Victoria Park
| 21,724
| 24 August 1985
|- bgcolor="#FFFFFF"
| 
| 17.22 (124)
| 
| 17.14 (116)
| MCG
| 14,581
| 24 August 1985
|- bgcolor="#FFFFFF"
| 
| 15.17 (107)
| 
| 12.12 (84)
| Princes Park
| 31,484
| 24 August 1985
|- bgcolor="#FFFFFF"
| 
| 12.7 (79)
| 
| 16.15 (111)
| VFL Park
| 16,174
| 24 August 1985
|- bgcolor="#FFFFFF"
| 
| 24.21 (165)
| 
| 14.13 (97)
| SCG
| 7,942
| 25 August 1985

Round 22

|- bgcolor="#CCCCFF"
| Home team
| Home team score
| Away team
| Away team score
| Venue
| Crowd
| Date
|- bgcolor="#FFFFFF"
| 
| 23.21 (159)
| 
| 14.11 (95)
| Princes Park
| 16,449
| 31 August 1985
|- bgcolor="#FFFFFF"
| 
| 14.13 (97)
| 
| 17.18 (120)
| Victoria Park
| 9,120
| 31 August 1985
|- bgcolor="#FFFFFF"
| 
| 20.12 (132)
| 
| 13.13 (91)
| MCG
| 17,158
| 31 August 1985
|- bgcolor="#FFFFFF"
| 
| 12.12 (84)
| 
| 8.18 (66)
| Moorabbin Oval
| 14,236
| 31 August 1985
|- bgcolor="#FFFFFF"
| 
| 12.9 (81)
| 
| 11.9 (75)
| VFL Park
| 37,027
| 31 August 1985
|- bgcolor="#FFFFFF"
| 
| 11.12 (78)
| 
| 24.21 (165)
| SCG
| 12,180
| 1 September 1985

Ladder

Finals series

Week one

Week two

Week three

Week four

Player Statistics and Awards

Leading goalkickers

Brownlow Medal count

 The Leigh Matthews Trophy was awarded to Greg Williams of Geelong. 
 The Norm Smith Medal was awarded to Simon Madden of Essendon.
  won the reserves premiership. Hawthorn 18.16 (114) defeated  16.12 (108) in the grand final, held as a curtain-raiser to the seniors Grand Final on 28 September at the Melbourne Cricket Ground.

Notable events
 In the first three rounds, St Kilda set an unwanted record of three consecutive losses by 100 points (110, 140 and 113 points). Their percentage at the end of the round was only 34.7.
 In a televised reserves match between Collingwood and the Sydney Swans at the Lake Oval in South Melbourne on Sunday, 28 April, Collingwood reserves full-back John Bourke kicked Swans ruckman Patrick Foy in the groin in response to Foy tagging him throughout the game. As field umpire Phil Waight went to report Bourke for the incident, Bourke  kicked and pushed Waight, then made contact with the Collingwood runner and jumped into the stands to attack a Swans fan before being escorted off the field. Bourke was found guilty at the Tribunal of kicking an umpire, kicking and assault, and was given the longest suspension in VFL/AFL history - 10 years plus 16 matches (239 matches), which was commuted in 1992 to six years plus 16 matches (151 matches). He was later charged with two counts of assault by Victoria Police, convicted on both counts in the Prahran Magistrates Court, and fined $2000 plus costs.
 In round 10, Geelong trailed at each change by 1, 10 and 13 points, but then kicked 11.7 (73) to 1.2 (8) in the last quarter to beat Richmond by 50 points. Their 50-point margin is the largest by a team outscored for each of the first three quarters.
 A violent brawl in the round 12 match between Hawthorn and Geelong led to veteran Hawthorn champion Leigh Matthews being charged with assaulting Geelong's Neville Bruns by Victoria Police.
 On the week of round 18, the Sydney Swans club was bought by Geoffrey Edelsten and became the first privately owned VFL club. Earlier in the season, Perth businessmen Alan Delany and John Watts had attempted to buy lowly St. Kilda and relocate them to Perth.
 In round 18, Essendon led North Melbourne 18.8 (116) to 2.4 (16) at half-time. This was the largest half-time lead since round 2 of 1931, when led by Richmond 17.9 (111) to North Melbourne's 0.5 (5).
 Collingwood player Andrew Witts wore jumper No. 65 during his seven games with the Magpies – the highest regular jumper number in VFL/AFL history. It was the highest number of all time until 2017 when a number of Indigenous players wore once-off jumper number No. 67 during Indigenous Round to recognise 50 years since the passage of the 1967 referendum on Aboriginals.
 In round 20, the Arden Street Oval hosted its last senior VFL match. The venue had been used by North Melbourne throughout its time in the VFL, except for 1965 when the club was based in Coburg. A total of 529 VFL senior matches were played at the ground that was formerly overshadowed by a massive gasometer on Macaulay Road.

See also
 McIntyre "final five" system

References

Bibliography
 Stephen Rodgers: Every Game Ever Played VFL/AFL Results 1897–1991 3rd Edition 1992. Penguin Books Australia .

External links
 1985 Season - AFL Tables

Australian Football League seasons
VFL season